Callianax strigata is a species of small sea snail, marine gastropod mollusk in the family Olividae, the olives.

Description

Distribution
Lower West Coast of America - California.

References

 Berry S.S. (1935) An undescribed Californian Olivella. Proceedings of the Malacological Society of London, 21: 262-265 
 Powell II, C. L.; Vervaet, F.; Berschauer, D. (2020). A taxonomic review of California Holocene Callianax (Olivellidae:Gastropoda:Mollusca) based on shell characters. The Festivus. Supplement - special issue, 1-38.

External links
 Reeve, L. A. (1850). Monograph of the genus Oliva. In: Conchologia Iconica, or, illustrations of the shells of molluscous animals, vol. 6, pl. 1-30 and unpaginated text. L. Reeve & Co., London.

Olivellinae
Gastropods described in 1850